Glaucocharis fuscobasella is a moth in the family Crambidae. It was described by Snellen in 1900. It is found in Indonesia, where it has been recorded from Java.

References

Diptychophorini
Moths described in 1900